The Jonquière Condors were a Canadian  minor pro ice hockey team in Jonquière, Quebec. They played in the Quebec Semi-Pro Hockey League from 1997-2002.

For the 2002-03 season, the franchise was moved to Saguenay, and became the Saguenay Paramedic.

Records
Games Eric Gravel, Richard Boivin 173
Goals Jean Imbeau 196
Assists Jean Imbeau 156
Points Jean Imbeau 252
PIM Dave LaSalle 801

External links
 The Internet Hockey Database

Ice hockey teams in Quebec
Ice hockey clubs established in 1997
Ice hockey clubs disestablished in 2003
Quebec Semi-Pro Hockey League teams
1997 establishments in Quebec
2003 disestablishments in Quebec
Sport in Saguenay, Quebec